The Core (established 1999 in Trondheim, Norway) is a Norwegian Jazz band, known from a series of recordings. It was initiated by the drummer Espen Aalberg, and are performing music in the Coltrane/Shorter tradition.

Biography 
Their musical expression are rooted in African-American music, with a touch of funk and rock.  After releasing the album Vision (2004), with music inspired by Pharoah Sanders, Archie Shepp, Albert Ayler and John Coltrane, they followed up with Blue sky (2006), with music composed by Steinar Raknes and Espen Aalberg, and some guitar contributions by Nils-Olav Johansen.

The Core has made their presence at most of the Norwegian Jazz festivals, where they have been joined by a number of guest soloists, such as James Carter, Jonas Kullhammar, Per Johansson and Håkon Kornstad. They were also broadcast on EBU at Tampere (2004). On request from the Norwegian Rikskonsertene and Utenriksdepartementet, they toured India, Pakistan and Bangladesh in 2005. This project was later presented to a Norwegian audience through a cultural exchange tour organized by Rikskonsertene a year later. Participants on both tours were the Indian musicians Fateh Ali (sitar and vocals), Prasanjit Mitra (tablas) and Kanchman Babbar (flute), and released on thealbum The Indian Core (2007).

Band members 
Espen Aalberg – drums
Jørgen Mathisen  –  saxophones
Erlend Slettevoll  –  piano
Steinar Raknes  –  double bass

Discography 
2004: Vision (Jazzaway)
2006: Blue Sky (Jazzaway)
2007: Office Essentials (Jazzland)
2007: Meditations On Coltrane (Grappa), with Bergen Big Band
2007: The Indian Core (Grappa)
2008: Golonka Love (Moserobie)
2009: The Art of No return (Moserobie)
2010: Party (Moserobie)

References

External links
The Core Official Website

Norwegian composers
Norwegian jazz ensembles
Musical groups established in 1999
Musical groups from Trondheim
Jazzaway Records artists
1999 establishments in Norway